"I Believe in You" is a song written by Roger Cook and Sam Hogin, and recorded by American country music artist Don Williams.  It was released in August 1980 as the first single and title track from the album I Believe in You.

Commercial performance
The song was Williams' eleventh number 1 on Billboard's country chart.  The single stayed at number 1 for two weeks and spent 12 weeks on the country chart.  "I Believe in You" was Don Williams' only Top 40 entry, where it peaked at number 24. The song has sold 286,000 downloads in the United States in the digital era.

The song was also a hit in Europe and Australia.  It was best received in New Zealand, where it reached number four on the pop singles chart and is ranked as the 38th biggest hit of 1981.

Charts

Weekly Charts

Year-end charts

References

1980 singles
Don Williams songs
Songs written by Roger Cook (songwriter)
Song recordings produced by Garth Fundis
MCA Records singles
Songs written by Sam Hogin
1980 songs